Tian Zengpei (born 8 October 1930) is a Chinese diplomat and politician who served as  from 1984 to 1985, Chinese Ambassador to Yugoslavia from 1986 to 1988, and chairperson of the Foreign Affairs Committee of the Chinese People's Political Consultative Conference from 1998 to 2003.

He was a member of the 14th Central Committee of the Chinese Communist Party.

Biography
Tian was born in Raoyang County, Hebei, on 8 October 1930. He attended Tianjin No. 1 High School. He graduated from the Department of Foreign Languages, Nankai University. He joined the Chinese Communist Party (CCP) in November 1947. He was sent abroad to study at the Central Youth League School of the Communist Youth League of the Soviet Union 1951 and returned to China in 1952. He worked at the Organization Department of the CCP Central Committee from 1954 to 1958. 

He joined the Foreign Service in 1970 and has served primarily in the Eastern Europe Division. He was counsellor of the Chinese Embassy in the Soviet Union in 1976, in addition to serving as counsellor of the Chinese Embassy in Yugoslavia. He was director of the Eastern Europe Division of the Ministry of Foreign Affairs in 1985, and held that office until 1986. In April 1988, he became vice minister of foreign affairs, a post he kept until March 1998. He also served as a member of the Drafting Committee of the Basic Law of the Macao Special Administrative Region since June 1990. He took office as chairperson of the Foreign Affairs Committee of the Chinese People's Political Consultative Conference in March 1998, serving in the post until his retirement in March 2003.

References

1930 births
Living people
People from Raoyang County
Nankai University alumni
Ambassadors of China to Yugoslavia
People's Republic of China politicians from Hebei
Chinese Communist Party politicians from Hebei
Members of the 14th Central Committee of the Chinese Communist Party